The women's cross-country competition at the 2010 Asian Games in Guangzhou was held on 19 November at the Dafushan Mountain Bike Course. The race was 32.4 kilometers long and began with a mass start. and involved six laps around the 5.4 kilometers.

Schedule
All times are China Standard Time (UTC+08:00)

Results

References

External links 
Results
Results

Mountain Women